Glendon is an unincorporated community in Guthrie County, Iowa, United States.

History 
Glendon was platted in 1880. The population of the community was 61 in 1925.

References 

Unincorporated communities in Iowa
Unincorporated communities in Guthrie County, Iowa
1880 establishments in Iowa
Populated places established in 1880